Sir Terence James O'Connor, KC (13 September 1891 – 7 May 1940) was a Conservative Party politician in the United Kingdom

Biography
Born in Bridgnorth, Shropshire, O'Connor served with the Highland Light Infantry and the West African Frontier Force during World War I. He was called to the bar in 1919, and became a bencher of the Inner Temple in 1936.

He was elected to the House of Commons at the 1924 general election, as Member of Parliament (MP) for Luton, but lost his seat at the October 1929 general election to the Liberal candidate, Leslie Burgin. He was appointed a King's Counsel that year.

O'Connor returned to Parliament seven months later in a by-election in the Nottingham Central constituency, and held the seat until his death in 1940, aged 48.

At the time of his death, was serving as Solicitor General, a position he had held since 1936 .

References

External links 
 

1940 deaths
1891 births
Conservative Party (UK) MPs for English constituencies
UK MPs 1924–1929
UK MPs 1929–1931
UK MPs 1931–1935
UK MPs 1935–1945
Politicians from Shropshire
Solicitors General for England and Wales
Knights Bachelor
British King's Counsel
People from Bridgnorth
Ministers in the Chamberlain wartime government, 1939–1940
Ministers in the Chamberlain peacetime government, 1937–1939